is a railway station in Nagai, Yamagata, Japan, operated by the Yamagata Railway.

Lines
Shirousagi Station is a station on the Flower Nagai Line, and is located 23.2 rail kilometers from the terminus of the line at Akayu Station.

Station layout
Shirousagi Station has a single side platform serving traffic in both directions. There is no station building, but only a shelter built on the platform.

Adjacent stations

History
Shirousagi Station opened on 16 December 1989.

Surrounding area
Mogami River

External links
  Flower Nagai Line 

Railway stations in Yamagata Prefecture
Yamagata Railway Flower Nagai Line
Railway stations in Japan opened in 1989